"The Curious Case of Benjamin Button" is a short story about a man who ages in reverse, from senescence to infancy, written by F. Scott Fitzgerald. It was first published in Collier's Magazine on May 27, 1922, with the cover and illustrations by James Montgomery Flagg. It was subsequently anthologized in Fitzgerald's 1922 book Tales of the Jazz Age, which is occasionally published as The Curious Case of Benjamin Button and Other Jazz Age Stories.

The story was later adapted into the 2008 namesake film and the 2019 stage musical.

Plot 
In 1860 Baltimore, Benjamin is born with the physical appearance of a 70-year-old man, already capable of speech. His father Roger invites neighbourhood boys to play with him and orders him to play with children's toys, but Benjamin obeys only to please his father. At five, Benjamin is sent to kindergarten but is quickly withdrawn after he repeatedly falls asleep during child activities.

At the age of 18, Benjamin enrolls in Yale College, but is sent home by officials, who think he is a 50-year-old lunatic. When Benjamin turns 20, the Button family realizes that he is aging backwards.

In 1880, when Benjamin is 20, his father gives him a control of Roger Button & Co. Wholesale Hardware. He meets the young Hildegarde Moncrief, a daughter of General Moncrief, and falls in love with her. Hildegarde mistakes Benjamin for a 50-year-old brother of Roger Button; she prefers older men and marries him six months later, but remains ignorant of his condition. Years later, Benjamin's business has been successful, but he is tired of Hildegarde because her beauty has faded and she nags him. Bored at home, he enlists in the Spanish–American War in 1898 and achieves great triumph in the military, rising to the rank of lieutenant colonel. He retires from the army to focus on his company, and receives a medal.

In 1910, Benjamin, now looking like a 20-year-old, turns over control of his company to his son, Roscoe, and enrolls at Harvard University. His first year there is a great success: he dominates in football and takes revenge against Yale for having rejected him years before. However, during his junior and senior years he is only 16 years old, too weak to play football and barely able to cope with the academic work.

After graduation, Benjamin returns home, only to learn that his wife has moved to Italy. He lives with Roscoe, who treats him sternly, and forces Benjamin to call him "uncle." As the years progress, Benjamin grows from a moody teenager into a child. Eventually, Roscoe has a child of his own who later attends kindergarten with Benjamin. After kindergarten, Benjamin slowly begins to lose memory of his earlier life. His memory fades away to the point where he cannot remember anything except his nurse. Everything fades to darkness shortly after.

See also 
One of the characters of Dan Simmons' Hyperion (1989) novel, Rachel, is also aging backwards.

References

External links 

 Full text of the story online at The University of Virginia
 Full text of the story online at Feedbooks.com
 
 Complete recording of original unabridged version of the 1922 short story at Archive.org
 
 "The Curious Case of Benjamin Button" by F. Scott Fitzgerald, Collier's Magazine, May 27, 1922. Illustrations by James Montgomery-Flagg.

1922 short stories
Fantasy short stories
Baltimore in fiction
Short stories adapted into films
Short stories by F. Scott Fitzgerald
Works originally published in Collier's
Magic realism

it:The Curious Case of Benjamin Button
pt:The Curious Case of Benjamin Button